Mukaab (en: Cube) is a proposed Saudi Arabian architectural project to build a mammoth cube shaped skyscraper which volumetrically could hold within it twenty Empire State Buildings.

Background 
The massive undertaking was announced by the Kingdom's de facto ruler Crown Prince Mohammed Bin Salman.  The design has been the subject of some criticism for its similarity to the Kaaba at the Masjid al-Haram mosque in Mecca, Islam's holiest shrine. 

The interior as currently planned will feature enormous holographic projections which will be aimed at transporting viewers to other paradigms, realities, times, and places.  The interior will also feature a swirling tower within for observation decks, restaurants, and from which the projections will emanate.

The Mukaab is planned to be the centerpiece of a giant new downtown built within the Saudi capital city of Riyadh called New Murabba. It will be the world's largest single built structure with around 2 million square meters of interior floor space.

The project will be undertaken by the New Murabba Development Company of which Crown Prince Mohammed Bin Salman is the President. 

The cube is intended to be 400 meters tall and 400 meters wide on each of its four sides.

Plans for the Cube are part of the Saudi Vision 2030 project.

The building's design is inspired by the modern Najdi architectural style.

The Mukaab will also feature a rooftop garden.

References

Saudi Arabia
Architecture
Cubes
Skyscrapers

External links
https://newmurabba.com/